The Kharraqan towers (as known as the Kharrakhan or Kharaghan towers) are a pair of mausolea built in 1067 and 1093, in the Kharraqan region of northern Iran, near Qazvin. They are notable for being an early example of geometric ornament, an early example of double domes, and one of the earlier tomb towers that appeared in Seljuq Iran during the 11th century.

The surface of both mausolea demonstrate extensive use of geometry. The interior walls of the older mausoleum are decorated with paintings of various subjects.

The eastern tower dates from 1067–68, and the western tower dates from 1093.

These towers are remnant examples of architecture that existed during the Seljuk period of medieval Persia.

Descriptions

Structure 
Both mausolea have double shells for the domes; the inner shells are intact, but the outer shells on both towers are lost. There is no direct access to light through the windows on the outer and inner shells of the dome. However, the opposite positions of the window on the two shells allow indirect light into the first tower through the side window on the inner shell.

Both octagonal towers have 8 rounded buttresses - one per corner. Stronach and Young speculate there were vertical ribs for the demolished outer shell of the dome; however, they conclude from the lack of same ribs in the inner side that the ridges, accompanying the ribs, were decorative.

Exterior 
Both towers have inscriptions of their architect on the exterior surface. Muhammad b. Makki al-Zanjani is inscribed on the earlier tower; Abu’l-Ma’ali b. Makki al-Zanjani, on the later tower. Stronach and Young indicate the two names refer to the same person—a local, unknown architect.

Also on the exterior of the buildings is an intricate geometric patterning formed of carved bricks. The brick also features lengthy inscriptions, both historical and Quranic. The historical inscription on the Eastern tower includes not only the architect, but also another name, possibly the mausoleum's intended patron, which can only be partially read due to damage.

The Kufic inscription of Quranic text on the exterior walls of both towers, identically distributed across sides and buttresses, features Sura 59, verses 21-23, recognizable despite damage on buttresses. Samuel Stern asserts that these Suras are an unusual choice for mausolea, but points to the preceding verses as being more fitting. Parts of the inscriptions above the Western tower's door can be recognized as Sura 23, Verse 115.

Interior 
The eastern tower's interior appears to have been fully decorated with frescoes, but only a few survive. There are paintings of mosque lamps in the niches, of pomegranate trees and peacocks in the piers alternating between them, and of a medallion surrounding peacocks and geometrical ornament near the top of the niches. There is also a band of Kufic calligraphy just below the beginning of the dome.

The western tower's interior contains no plaster decoration; instead, there are a mihrab and additional brick ornament.

It is believed that the occupant of the eastern tower was Abu Sa'id Bijar and the occupant of the western tower was Abu Mansur Iltayti, according to Dr. Samuel Miklós Stern's transliteration of the inscriptions on the towers.

Interpretations 
The Kharraqan towers exhibit more elaborate external design, individualized for each of the 8 sides, in comparison to other towers with more repetitive patterns. Oleg Grabar reminds that there is no concrete method of elucidating the meaning of the abstract, geometric decoration in Islamic architecture. Instead, the intricacy of the geometric pattern promotes appreciation of the visual design itself.

The subjects of wall paintings inside the western tower possess symbolic association with heaven. Abbas Daneshvari connects the light of the lamp with the light of the god, thus with paradise. Daneshvari further associates the interior paintings with paradise by emphasizing the iconographic role of peacocks, in sunburst medallions, as the bird of paradise. Peacocks appear in the Islamic medieval culture of Iran in literature and art objects such as textiles and ceramic wares.

21st century

Both towers were significantly damaged by the 2002 Bou'in-Zahra earthquake. They were in a good state of preservation before the event, suggesting it was one of the most powerful quakes in the region for approximately 900 years.

See also
Iranian architecture
Cultural Heritage, Handcrafts and Tourism Organization
Seljuk Architecture
History of Persian domes

References

Buildings and structures completed in 1067
Buildings and structures completed in 1093
Mausoleums in Iran
Architecture in Iran
Buildings and structures in Qazvin Province
Seljuk architecture
National works of Iran
11th century in Iran